The following are the squads for the 2022 FIBA AmeriCup.

Ages and clubs are as of the opening day of the tournament, 2 September 2022.

Group A

Brazil
The squad was announced on 1 September 2022.

Canada
The squad was announced on 1 September 2022.

Colombia
The squad was announced on 1 September 2022.

Uruguay
The squad was announced on 1 September 2022.

Group B

Argentina
The squad was announced on 2 September 2022.

Dominican Republic
The squad was announced on 1 September 2022.

Puerto Rico
The squad was announced on 31 August 2022.

Virgin Islands

Group C

Mexico
The squad was announced on 2 September 2022.

Panama
The squad was announced on 1 September 2022.

United States
The squad was announced on 27 August 2022.

Venezuela
The squad was announced on 30 August 2022.

References

External links

2022
Squads